A cause célèbre is an issue or incident arousing widespread controversy. 

Cause célèbre may also refer to:

 Cause Célèbre (play), a 1975 radio play by Terence Rattigan

See also
 Cause Celeb, a 1994 novel by Helen Fielding